The Pembroke Memorial Centre is a 2250-seat multi-purpose arena in Pembroke, Ontario. Along with the Pembroke & Area Community Centre, the P.M.C. is one of two hockey rinks in Pembroke, and is home to the Pembroke Lumber Kings ice hockey team. Built in the early 1950s, the P.M.C. was named as a tribute to soldiers who served in World War I and World War II.

The Pembroke Memorial Centre was officially opened on November 14, 1951 with an exhibition game between the Pembroke Senior Lumber Kings and the Montreal Canadiens of the National Hockey League.  Several future hall of famers played in the game for the Canadiens, including Maurice 'Rocket' Richard, 'Boom-Boom' Geoffrion, Elmer Lach and Doug Harvey. NHL President, Clarence Campbell, attended the sold-out game, and participated in a ceremonial puck drop as part of the pre-game festivities.

The Memorial Centre replaced the privately owned Mackay Street Arena which had operated since the turn of the century in Pembroke. That arena had natural ice and became obsolete with the invention of artificial ice which the new Memorial Centre had.

On the occasion of the 50th anniversary of the PMC on November 14, 2001, an exhibition game was played between the Pembroke Lumber King alumni and an Ottawa Senators alumni squad. Lionel Barber, then 70 years old, played in the anniversary game, making him the only player to have also played in the opening game at the PMC in 1951. Barber had moved to Pembroke to play senior hockey, after helping the Barrie Flyers win a Memorial Cup in junior hockey.

The Pembroke Memorial Centre hosted the Centennial Cup championship tournament in the spring of 1988.

References

Indoor arenas in Ontario
Indoor ice hockey venues in Canada
Sports venues in Ontario
Pembroke, Ontario
Buildings and structures in Renfrew County